Asheville City SC is an American amateur soccer team based in Asheville, North Carolina. Founded in 2016, the men's team plays in USL League Two, the fourth tier of the American Soccer Pyramid. The women's team was founded in 2017 and played in the Women's Premier Soccer League until joining the newly-formed USL W League for the 2022 season. The team colors are blue and white.

History 

Asheville City SC was announced as a National Premier Soccer League expansion team on November 14, 2016. On the day of the announcement, the ownership group was announced: Chairman/CFO Jimmy Wheeler, President Ryan Kelley, General Manager Allen Bradley, Director of Revenue Management Jordan Vance, Director of Community Outreach Josh Yoakum, and Director of Communications Andrew Hunter. All members of the ownership group are Western North Carolina natives.

The same day of the announcement City SC announced that Gary Hamel was going to serve as the club's head coach. Hamel served as the head coach of the nearby Mars Hill University's men's soccer program. Hamel additionally served as an assistant coach for the Oregon State Beavers men's soccer program.

Asheville City SC also announced on its foundation date, that the club will play its home matches at Memorial Stadium in Downtown Asheville.

On December 5, 2016 the club announced it would compete in the East division of the Southeast Conference. On May 6, 2017, Asheville City won its first ever match in NPSL play.

On October 16, 2019 the club announced it would join USL League Two.

Colors and badge 

The crest was designed with four elements in minds in order to represent the city of Asheville, North Carolina. The colors in the crest a "blue haze" and white. The blue haze color represents the blue hazy seen in the nearby Smoky Mountains, while the color white is the color of all colors, alluding to the spirit of inclusion of Asheville. The silhouette in the crest is of Asheville City Hall, which serves as a homage to the club's downtown location. The "AC" monogram in the logo is a reference to the sport of soccer's tradition in emblems over the last century. The "AC" stands for 'Asheville City' as well as used to recognize the city's love for the game.

Stadium 
Asheville City plays at Memorial Stadium in downtown Asheville.

Year-by-year

2022 Men's Roster

2019 Women's Roster

Rivalries 
Asheville City competes with Chattanooga FC for the "Blue Ridge Derby". Asheville City also competes in the "Carolina Clasico" with Greenville FC.

Staff

References 

Association football clubs established in 2016
Sports in Asheville, North Carolina
Soccer clubs in North Carolina
USL League Two teams
National Premier Soccer League teams
2016 establishments in North Carolina